The Men's 4 × 100 metre freestyle relay competition of the 2018 African Swimming Championships was held on 13 September 2018.

Records
Prior to the competition, the existing world and championship records were as follows.

The following new records were set during this competition.

Results

Final
The final was started on 13 September.

References

Men's 4 x 100 metre freestyle relay